The 1896 season was the 13th season of regional competitive association football in Australia.

League competitions

Cup competitions

(Note: figures in parentheses display the club's competition record as winners/runners-up.)

See also 

 Soccer in Australia

References 

Seasons in Australian soccer
1896 in Australian sport
Australian soccer by year
Australian soccer